Cygnus is an expendable American cargo spacecraft developed by Orbital Sciences Corporation and now manufactured and launched by Northrop Grumman Space Systems as part of NASA's Commercial Resupply Services (CRS) program. It is usually launched by Northrop Grumman's Antares rocket, although three flights were on ULA's Atlas V and three are planned to launch on SpaceX' Falcon 9. It is designed to transport supplies to the International Space Station (ISS) following the retirement of the American Space Shuttle. Since August 2000, ISS resupply missions have been regularly flown by the Russian Progress spacecraft, as well as by the European Automated Transfer Vehicle, and the Japanese H-II Transfer Vehicle. With the Cygnus spacecraft and the SpaceX Dragon, NASA seeks to increase its partnerships with domestic commercial aviation and aeronautics industry.

Cygnus is the Latinized Greek word for swan and a northern constellation.

Development 

With Rocketplane Kistler unable to meet funding obligations for its K-1 launch vehicle under the terms of the COTS agreement, NASA decided on 18 October 2007 to terminate its contract with Rocketplane Kistler and re-award its contract after a competition. On 19 February 2008, NASA announced that it had chosen Orbital Sciences as the new winner. On 23 December 2008, NASA awarded Orbital Sciences a $1.9 billion contract under the Commercial Resupply Services (CRS) program. Under this contract, Orbital Sciences agreed to deliver up to 20 tons of cargo to the ISS through 2016 in eight Cygnus spacecraft flights.

By April 2010, Orbital had displayed a full-scale model of the Cygnus cargo delivery spacecraft at the National Space Symposium (NSS) in Colorado Springs, CO.

Launched on an Antares (renamed from Taurus II) medium-class launch vehicle or Atlas V, the first Cygnus flight was originally planned to occur in December 2010.· The Cygnus demonstration mission was successfully launched on 18 September 2013. On 12 January 2014, the first scheduled Cygnus resupply mission arrived at the space station; the capsule carried Christmas presents and fresh fruit for the astronauts. Its arrival was delayed, first by the need to repair the station, and then by frigid weather at the launch site and solar flares that forced postponements.·

With the December 2015 launch of Orb CRS-4 on Atlas V, the enhanced version of Cygnus made its debut. While it was planned from the beginning to fly on the fifth mission, the Orb CRS-3 failure and subsequent move to Atlas V meant a delay.

Design 

The Cygnus spacecraft consists of two basic components: the Pressurized Cargo Module (PCM) and the Service Module (SM). The PCM is manufactured by Thales Alenia Space in Turin, (Italy). The initial PCMs have an empty mass of 1,500 kg  and a volume of 18 m3·. The service module is built by Orbital ATK and is based on their GEOStar and LEOStar spacecraft buses as well as components from the development of the Dawn spacecraft. It has a gross mass of 1,800 kg with propulsion provided by thrusters using the hypergolic propellants hydrazine and nitrogen tetroxide (the propellant mass is 800 kg ). The service module is capable of producing up to 4 kW of electrical power via two gallium arsenide solar arrays. On 12 November 2009, Dutch Space announced it will provide the solar arrays for the initial Cygnus spacecraft.

The fourth and all subsequent Cygnus spacecraft are planned to be of the "Enhanced" variant, as the standard variant has been retired. These will use a stretched 1,800-kilogram (empty weight) PCM which increases the interior volume to 27 m3 and the service module will use Orbital ATK Ultraflex solar arrays which will provide the same amount of power as the previous solar arrays but at a lower mass.· A new upper stage built by Orbital ATK, the Castor 30XL, will be used in conjunction with the enhanced Cygnus; because of the more powerful upper stage and the lighter solar arrays, the payload that Cygnus can deliver to the ISS will be increased by 700 kg.

During nominal CRS missions, Cygnus maneuvers close to the International Space Station, where the Canadarm2 robotic arm grapples the spacecraft and berths it to a Common Berthing Mechanism on the Harmony module in a similar fashion to the Japanese H-II Transfer Vehicle and the retired SpaceX Dragon, but not the other active American CRS Dragon 2 vehicle, which docks autonomously. For typical missions, Cygnus is planned to remain berthed for about 30 days.· Unlike Dragon 2 and the earlier Dragon, Cygnus does not provide cargo return capability. However, it can be loaded with obsolete equipment and trash for destructive reentry similar to the Russian Progress vehicles.

A formerly planned variant of Cygnus would have replaced the PCM with the Unpressurized Cargo Module (UCM), based on NASA's ExPRESS Logistics Carrier, and would have been used to transport unpressurized cargo, such as ISS Orbital Replacement Units.· Another proposed variant would have replaced the PCM with the Return Cargo Module (RCM), which would have allowed Cygnus to return cargo to Earth.·

Lunar Gateway module variant
In August 2019, NASA decided to sole source its design for the Minimal Habitation Module (now known as the Habitation and Logistics Outpost, or HALO) of the Lunar Gateway to Northrop Grumman Innovation Systems, which offered a minimalist 6.1-meter (20 feet) by 3-meter (9.8 feet) design based directly on the Enhanced Cygnus, as well as a larger 7-meter (22.9 feet) by 4.4-meter (14.4 feet) design also based on the Cygnus, to the outside of which radial docking ports, body-mounted radiators (BMRs), batteries and communications antennae will be added. Northrop Grumman Innovation Systems opted to build the minimalist design, which offered the advantage of component compatibility and expedited testing of life support systems on existing Cygnus spacecraft.  On 5 June 2020, NASA awarded Northrop Grumman Innovation Systems a $187 million contract to complete the preliminary design of HALO. NASA will sign a separate contract with Northrop for the fabrication of the HALO, and for integration with the Power and Propulsion Element (PPE), being built by Maxar.

Missions 
List includes only missions that have flown and five planned missions.  one mission is currently planned to be launched from Mid-Atlantic Regional Spaceport Launch Pad 0A on the one remaining Antares 230+ rocket, three are to be launched on the Falcon 9 rocket from Cape Canaveral SLC-40, and one from Wallops on an Antares 330.

The PCM of each mission thus far has been named after a deceased NASA staffer (mostly astronauts).

In March 2022, NASA ordered six additional flights, Cygnus NG-20 to NG-25, to resupply the ISS through 2026.

See also 
 Space Shuttle retirement
 Comparison of space station cargo vehicles

References

External links 

 Orbital Sciences news page for Cygnus
 NASA Commercial Resupply Mission Update : Northrop Grumman
 Thales Alenia Space page for Cygnus
 Computer animation of the Standard Cygnus delivering cargo to the ISS - Youtube

 
Cargo spacecraft
American spacecraft
Supply vehicles for the International Space Station
Vehicles introduced in 2013
Northrop Grumman spacecraft
Orbital Sciences Corporation
Commercial spaceflight